Edith Williams (1899–1979) was a Canadian veterinarian.

Edith Williams may also refer to:
Edith Clifford Williams, (1885–1971), pioneer in the American abstract art movement
Edith L. Williams, (1887–1987), US Virgin Islands educator and suffragist
Edith Derby Williams, (1917–2008) Roosevelt family member and conservationist historian